Introvision International was a special effects company that worked on several big Hollywood films founded in 1980 and ceased operations at 1011 N Fuller Hollywood in 2001, moving to a smaller location in North Hollywood. The Introvision System  primarily used its Introvision front projection system. Tom Naud was the founder and president of the company. Issachar “Issy Shabtay” built the entire studios location and was studios facilities manager, head set builder, and head of studio operations.

Visual effects filmography
Outland (1981)
Megaforce (1982)
Inside the Third Reich (1982) (TV)
Two of a Kind (1983)
The Night They Saved Christmas (1984) (TV)
Oh, God! You Devil (1984)
The Hugga Bunch (1985) (TV)
The Christmas Star (1986) (TV)
Oceans of Fire (1986) (TV)
Housekeeping (1987)
Poor Little Rich Girl: The Barbara Hutton Story (1987) (TV)
Adventures in Babysitting (1987)
Murder by the Book (1987) (TV)
Monster in the Closet (1987)
Distant Thunder (1988)
Rambo III (1988)
Sunset (1988)
Driving Miss Daisy (1989)
Lock Up (1989)
UHF (1989)
The Karate Kid Part III (1989)
976-EVIL (1989)
Darkman (1990)
Miracle Landing (1990) (TV)
Billy Bathgate (1991)
Black Robe (1991)
Blood Ties (1991) (TV)
If Looks Could Kill (1991)
Flight of the Intruder (1991)
Army of Darkness (1992) (visual effects)
Under Siege (1992)
Monolith (1993)
Fearless (1993) (special visual effects)
The Tower (1993) (TV)
The Fugitive (1993)
Rapture (1993) (TV)
Silent Fall (1994)
The River Wild (1994)(special visual effects)
Candyman: Farewell to the Flesh (1995)
Land's End (1996)
Team Knight Rider (1997)
Robinson Crusoe (1997)
The Big Lebowski (1998 film) (visual effects)
''Boogie Nights"" (1997) 

Special effects companies